Lindsey Pollard is an animator from Victoria, British Columbia, Canada, now residing in Los Angeles, California. Her work as an animation director on the children's Cartoon Network series Camp Lazlo garnered three Pulcinella awards, two Emmy nominations, and a 2007 Emmy win.  In 1994, she received The Grand Prize Norman McLaren Award and won "Best Animation" in the Montreal World Film Festival for her student film The Chain Letter.  As a member of The Emily Carr Institute Alumni, she received The Emily Award in Recognition of Outstanding Achievement in 2008.  Lindsey was an assistant director on The Simpsons Movie and a timer on My Gym Partner's a Monkey, The Simpsons, Drawn Together, The Fairly OddParents, The Oblongs, Baby Blues, The Cramp Twins, and Mission Hill.  She is currently a retake director on the Emmy award-winning hit series Family Guy.

References

External links
 
 Emily Carr Institute Honoree Page

Living people
Canadian women television directors
Canadian television directors
Canadian animated film directors
Canadian women film directors
Film directors from Victoria, British Columbia
Emily Carr University of Art and Design alumni
Primetime Emmy Award winners
Canadian women animators
Year of birth missing (living people)